Luján Partido is a partido in the northeastern part of Buenos Aires Province in Argentina.

Economy
The economy of Luján Partido is dominated by farming, other aspects include textile and medical manufacturing, and the production of agrochemicals and agricultural machinery.

Settlements
Cortínez
Jáuregui
Luján
Olivera
Open Door
Carlos Keen
Pueblo Nuevo
Torres

External links

 Luján Argentina Website
 Luján net website
 InfoBAN Luján

Partidos of Buenos Aires Province
States and territories established in 1731